Lois Davidson Gottlieb (November 13, 1926 - August 12, 2018) was an American architect best known for residential designs. She was born in San Francisco, California. Gottlieb's professional career spans more than 50 years. She practiced architecture in and outside the U.S. as a prolific residential designer. Most of her domestic designs can be found in California, Washington, Idaho and Virginia. Gottlieb's works have been featured in various publications, exhibits, and the documentary video made about her work on 'The Gottlieb House' in Fairfax Station, Virginia. Lois Davidson was an apprentice to Frank Lloyd Wright as a part of the Taliesin Fellowship in Scottsdale, Arizona, and Wright's winter home and the western counterpart to Taliesin East in Spring Green, Wisconsin, 1948–1949. Gottlieb co-founded an architectural firm, Duncombe-Davidson, with A. Jane Duncombe, who is also one of the apprentices to Wright's Taliesin at that time. Gottlieb is also a former member of International Archive of Women in Architecture Board of Directors. She died on August 12, 2018 at age 91.

Education 
Gottlieb attended Stanford University, where she studied pre-architecture, a combination of art and engineering before earning a Bachelor of Arts degree from 1944 to 1947.

In the last quarter of her senior year, Gottlieb was about to graduate from Stanford University and did not know what to do with herself. she visited Frank Lloyd Wright's Hanna-Honeycomb House (1936) near the university campus for one of the classes she took. As she would later recall, "I was stunned and enchanted. lt was as though l had never heard music before and here was confronted with the visual equivalent of a Beethoven symphony." Driven by the appreciation for, and a desire to learn more about the design philosophy of Wright's architecture, Gottlieb applied and later accepted as an apprentice to the Taliesin Fellowship. She began a two-year journey of work and study with Wright in 1948; she was to discover that architecture could be "a way of life". Gottlieb was one of the few women who have been apprenticed to Frank Lloyd Wright as a Taliesin fellow. During her time at Taliesin, she worked on the Eric and Pat Pratt Residence, aka the Pratt house in Michigan, and the Walker house in Carmel, California. Her book, A Way of Life: An Apprenticeship with Frank Lloyd Wright records the eighteen months that she spent with Frank Lloyd Wright's Taliesin Fellowship in the late 1940s.

Upon the completion of Taliesin fellowship, Gottlieb went to Harvard University's School of Design from 1949 to 1950 to continued professional training and eventually received her architecture license.

Family
Not only Gottlieb was accomplished as a woman designer in a profession traditionally dominated by men, but also one of the few women to have been apprenticed to Frank Lloyd Wright who succeeded in charting an independent career for herself. And all these was done while raising up two children - Karen Gottlieb and Mark Gottlieb - as well as being involved in her husband 's career as an ethnomusicologist, which included the family living in India and Australia eight times for as much as a year several times.

Designs 
Gottlieb had learned at Taliesin that beauty is architecture in a matter of principle that every architect has to discover by himself or herself. As Gottlieb recalled, "When I first joined Frank Lloyd Wright's Taliesin Fellowship in 1948, it was winter and Mr. and Mrs. Wright and their group of apprentice were living at the desert camp in Arizona. I arrived with a sleeping bag and baggage, and Mrs. Wright led me into the desert to a tiny, pyramidal tent. She said, 'This is your tent and it is up to you make it beautiful.'" Gottlieb believes the apprenticeship with Wright also taught her "to be harmonious with nature and to take full advantage of a beautiful setting." Gottlieb was able to interpret these Wrightian principles in her own practice, as described in her beautifully written theoretical book, Environment and Design in Housing (1968). Gottlieb's first California house: Val-Goeshen, Inverness (1951), Robert S. Gottlieb, San Francisco (1955), and Robert S. Gottlieb, Riverside (1964) - all share reverence for nature, careful attention to materials, and celebration of the activities that define the sanctuary of the home, true to Wrightian spirit of an "Organic Architecture."  [A Way of Life: An Apprenticeship with Frank Lloyd Wright, 12-16]. However, her most notable architectural work was the Mark Gottlieb House. Built in 1996, it was her largest and most audacious work at 11,000 sq. ft. As one of the last works of her career, it has been regarded as her architectural masterpiece.

Architectural works 

 Val-Goeshen, Inverness, California (1951)
 Robert S. Gottlieb, San Francisco, California (1955)
 Robert S. Gottlieb, Riverside, California (1964)
 Mackey House, Riverside, California (1966)
 Beals House, Riverside California (1967)
 Hansen House, Seattle, Washington (1978)
 Lynn House, Ketchum, Idaho (1980)
 Harrah Energy Efficient House, Sedona, Arizona (1981)
 Mark Gottlieb House, Fairfax, Virginia (1996)

Publications

Writings 

 The Balance between Diversity and specialization in American and Indian education, Fulbright Newsletter, Spring 1972.
 Environment and Design in Housing, Macmillan,1968. [ASIN: B0000CMTSS]
 A Way of Life: An Apprenticeship with Frank Lloyd Wright, Mulgrave: Images Publishing, 2001.

Documentaries

Building a Dream: A Family Affair (1998) 
At Taliesin, Gottlieb recalled, "if you wanted something, you made it." As a result, she was "creative about using new methods and materials, such as Trex decking made from melted trash bags and sawdust, and block made from recycled plastic bottles as forms for concrete walls, camouflaged with brick veneer." [Women & Creativity 36]  One of her final architectural projects was the design and construction of an 11,000 sq. ft. home and office complex for her son and his wife and family, Mark & Sharon Gottlieb. It was built in Fairfax Station, VA, of recycled materials (such as laminated wood and ice block). This was chronicled and produced with Eva Soltes in the documentary film “Building a Dream: A Family Affair”.

A Woman is a Fellow Here - 100 Women Architects in the Studio of Frank Lloyd Wright (2009) 
Gottlieb was one of the few women who have been apprenticed to Frank Lloyd Wright as a Taliesin fellow. She is one of the six women in architecture featured in the Beverly Willis Architecture Foundation movie "A Woman is a Fellow Here". The other women featured included Marion Mahony Griffin, Eleanore Pettersen, Jane Duncombe, Isabel Roberts, and Read Weber.

Legacy 
Gottlieb's papers, designs, and drawings were donated in 1997 and 2003 to the International Archive of Women in Architecture at Virginia Tech, which is founded by Professor of Architecture Milka T. Bliznakov in 1985. The collected papers (Ms1997-003) include project files, drawings, correspondence, manuscripts, photographs and printed material related to Gottlieb's design work and various professional activities. There is also documentary footage by Eva Soltes Productions about Lois Gottlieb, including tapes entitled "Lois Plans," "A Way of Life (demo reel)" and "House and Exterior by Robert Gottlieb," 1995–1997. Photographs of some of her works are available on the VT ImageBase.

Further reading 
Gottlieb, Lois D. "The Usefulness of the IAWA", International Archive of Women Architecture, no. 18 (Fall 2006).

External links 
 "HISTORIAN'S CORNER: MAY 2019, Pt.IV" at Taliesin Preservation, Inc.
 ImageBase at Virginia Tech

References

1926 births
2018 deaths
20th-century American architects
Stanford University alumni
Harvard Graduate School of Design alumni
Women architects